Jane's Fighting Ships by Janes Information Services is an annual reference book of information on all the world's warships arranged by nation, including information on ships' names, dimensions, armaments, silhouettes and photographs, etc. Each edition describes and illustrates warships of different national naval and paramilitary forces, providing data on their characteristics. The first issue was illustrated with Jane's own ink sketches--photos began to appear with the third volume in 1900. The present title was adopted in 1905. 

It was originally published by Fred T. Jane in London in 1898 as Jane's All the World's Fighting Ships, in order to assist naval officers and the general public in playing naval wargames. Its success eventually launched a number of military publications carrying the name "Jane's". It is a unit of Jane's Information Group, which is now owned by IHS.

Ten early editions of Jane's (those of 1898, 1905-06, 1906-07, 1914, 1919, 1924, 1931, 1939, 1944-45, and 1950-51) were reissued in facsimile reprints by Arco Publishing starting in 1969. All of these appeared in the oblong or "landscape" format that characterized the series until the 1956/57 edition, while from 1957/58 the present "portrait" layout was adopted, thus matching the sister Jane's publication on aircraft.

Beginning in the early 2000s, Jane's has also been published online, on CD and microfiche.

Editors
1898–1915: Fred T. Jane
1916–1917: Maurice Prendergast
1918–1922: Oscar Parkes with Maurice Prendergast
1923–1929: Oscar Parkes with Francis E. McMurtrie
1930–1934: Oscar Parkes
1935–1948: Francis E. McMurtrie
1949–1973: Raymond Blackman
1974–1988: Capt. John Moore (RN)
1988–2000: Capt. Richard Sharpe (RN)
2000–2017: Commodore Stephen Saunders (RN)
2018–present: Alex Pape

See also
 Brassey's Naval Annual : competing publication
 Combat Fleets of the World : competing publication

References

Brooks, Richard. Fred T. Jane: An Eccentric Visionary. Coulsdon, Surrey: Jane's Information Group, 1997.

External links

 

1898 non-fiction books
1898 establishments in the United Kingdom
Book series introduced in 1898
Publications established in 1898
Books of naval history
Nautical reference works